Needham Market is a town in Suffolk, England. The town of Needham, Massachusetts, was named after Needham Market.

History

It initially grew around the wool combing industry, until the onset of the plague, which swept the town from 1663 to 1665. To prevent the spread of the disease, the town was chained at either end, which succeeded in its task but at the cost of two-thirds of the populace. The town did not recover for nearly two hundred years, with the canalisation of the River Gipping in the late 18th Century and the introduction of the railway. Modern Needham Market contains two road names that are linked to the plague. Chainhouse Road, named after the chains that ran across the East end of the town. The Causeway, is a modern variation of 'the corpseway' so called because of the route that plague victims were transported out of town, to neighbouring Barking church for interment.

Notable buildings
Notable buildings in the town include:

 The 15th-century Church of St. John the Baptist, originally a chapel of ease for the parish of Barking (with a unique double-hammerbeam roof).
The medieval Limes Hotel which dates back to around 1500.
The Old Town Hall which was designed by the English architect, Frederick Barnes and completed in 1866.

Sport and leisure
Needham Market has a Non-League football club Needham Market F.C. who play at Bloomfields, they have been very successful over recent years after reaching the semi-finals of the FA Vase.

The town is on the route of the Dunwich Dynamo annual cycle ride.

Needham Lake (a former gravel pit) provides leisure facilities and a wildlife habitat.

Transport
The East Anglia Main Line railway runs through the town, with Needham Market railway station providing trains to Ipswich and Cambridge. Needham Market railway station is a very small unstaffed station and is managed by Greater Anglia. The A14 (although then the A45) once ran directly through Needham Market, but a bypass was built in the 1970s. This has left the town with good road links to the surrounding area, but with less traffic than before.

Notable people
Notable people from Needham include:
 Dykes Alexander  (1763–1849), Quaker businessman and minister.
 June Brown (1927–2022), actress who played Dot Cotton in EastEnders
 Ros Scott (born 1957), Liberal Democrat peer, a former district and county councillor for the town, chose it for her title.

References

External links
Needham Market Town Council

 
Towns in Suffolk
Market towns in Suffolk
Civil parishes in Suffolk
Mid Suffolk District